Homage (from Medieval Latin , lit. "pertaining to a man") in the Middle Ages was the ceremony in which a feudal tenant or vassal pledged reverence and submission to his feudal lord, receiving in exchange the symbolic title to his new position (investiture). It was a symbolic acknowledgement to the lord that the vassal was, literally, his man (homme). The oath known as "fealty" implied lesser obligations than did "homage". Further, one could swear "fealty" to many different overlords with respect to different land holdings, but "homage" could only be performed to a single liege, as one could not be "his man" (i.e., committed to military service) to more than one "liege lord". 

There have been some conflicts about obligations of homage in history. For example, the Angevin monarchs of England were sovereign in England, i.e., they had no duty of homage regarding those holdings; but they were not sovereign regarding their French holdings. Henry II was king of England, but he was merely duke of Normandy and Aquitaine and count of Anjou and Poitou. The Capetian kings in Paris, though weaker militarily than many of their vassals until the reign of King Philip Augustus, claimed a right of homage. The usual oath was therefore modified by Henry to add the qualification "for the lands I hold overseas." The implication was that no "knights service" was owed for the English lands.

After King John of England was forced to surrender Normandy to Philip in 1204, English magnates with holdings on both sides of the Channel were faced with conflict. John still expected to recover his ancestral lands, and those English lords who held lands in Normandy would have to choose sides. Many were forced to abandon their continental holdings. Two of the most powerful magnates, Robert de Beaumont, 4th Earl of Leicester, and William Marshal, 1st Earl of Pembroke, negotiated an arrangement with the French king that if John had not recovered Normandy in a year-and-a-day, they would do homage to Philip. At first that seemed to satisfy John, but eventually, as a price for making peace with the French king to keep his lands, Pembroke fell out of favour with John.

The conflict between the French monarchs and the Angevin kings of England continued through the 13th century. When Edward I of England was asked to provide military service to Philip III of France in his war with Aragon in 1285, Edward made preparations to provide service from Gascony (but not England – he had not done "homage", and thus owed no service to France for the English lands). Edward's Gascon subjects did not want to go to war with their southern neighbours on behalf of France, and they undoubtedly appealed to Edward that as a sovereign, he owed the French king no service at all. A truce was arranged, however, before Edward had to decide what to do. But when Philip III died, and his son Philip IV ascended the French throne in 1286, Edward dutifully but reluctantly performed "homage" for the sake of peace. In doing so, Edward added yet another qualification – that the duty owed was "according to the terms of the peace made between our ancestors".

See also

Allegiance
Charge
Duty
Fealty
Feudalism in the Holy Roman Empire
Honor

References

Ceremonies
Feudalism